Dumbletonius is a genus of moths of the family Hepialidae. There are two described species, both endemic to New Zealand.

The genus was named in honour of Lionel Jack Dumbleton.

Species
 Dumbletonius characterifer
 Dumbletonius unimaculata

References

External links
 Hepialidae genera

Hepialidae
Moths of New Zealand
Exoporia genera
Endemic moths of New Zealand